"All She Wants to Do Is Rock" is a 1949 single by Wynonie Harris. The song was the most successful of Wynonie Harris' solo career hitting number one on the U.S. R&B chart. The B-side, "I Want My Fanny Brown", which made it to number ten on the R&B chart, is an answer song to Roy Brown's "Miss Fanny Brown".

References

1949 songs
Song articles with missing songwriters